Herederos por accidente is a Mexican comedy-drama web television series created by Frank Ariza. The serie have 2 seasons each one with 13 episodes. All episodes of the series became available for streaming on Claro Video on 3 April 2020. The series stars Consuelo Duval, Maite Perroni, and Cuca Escribano.

Cast 
 Consuelo Duval
 Maite Perroni as Lu
 Michel Duval as Marco
 Jorge Caballero as Alex
 Camila Valero as Mafer
 Cuca Escribano as Rosa
 Luis Miguel Seguí as Diego
 Manuel Vera as Martín
 Horacio Colomé as Robert
 Xavier Cervantes as Don José Márquez de Guevara
 Alberto Collado as Jacinto
 Mara López as Carlota
 Carmen Muga as Rocío
 Norma Angélica as Amanda
 Álvaro Fontalba as Borja
 Sara Montalvo as Mercedes
 Walter Kapelas as Ambrosio
 Diego Luque as Manolito "El Tigre"

Synopsis 
After Don José's supposedly accidental death, a Mexican and a Spanish family end up fighting over his inheritance. The baby Lupe is expecting is the heir to this whole fortune. However, the two families hide great secrets.

Season 1

Season 2

References 

Claro Video original programming
2020 Mexican television series debuts
Spanish-language television shows